The Portrait of Juan Martínez Montañés is an unfinished 1636 portrait of the sculptor Juan Martínez Montañés by Diego Velázquez. It is now in the collection of the Prado museum in Madrid.

History
It was painted while its subject called on Velázquez during a trip to Madrid between June 1635 and January 1636. The trip was to make a clay bust of Philip IV of Spain as the modello for the Florentine sculptor Pietro Tacca's bronze equestrian statue of Philip (the statue now on plaza de Oriente in Madrid), which is what he is shown doing in the portrait, shaping the clay with a stick (though the bust itself is only in outline, since the painting is unfinished). 

The 36-year-old Velázquez's relationship with the 67-year-old Montañés was long-standing – Velázquez's tutor Francisco Pacheco added painted colour to several of Montañés's major sculptures. Most of the painter's attention is on the face and hands, though he took great care over the rest of the portrait, highlighting the white cuffs against the otherwise entirely black costume with ease and fluidity.

Montanes
Montanes
1636 paintings
Montanes
1630s in Spain
Montanes
Unfinished paintings